Vent d'est  is a Franco-Swiss historical drama film directed by Robert Enrico, on a script co-written with Frédéric H. Fajardie, released in 1993.

Plot
At the end of the Second World War, a regiment of the First Russian National Army, loyal to Nazi Germany fled to neutral Liechtenstein to escape the Red Army.

Seeking asylum and salvation in this neutral state, these soldiers, along with some civilian associates, are warmly welcomed by the Liechtenstein government. Indeed, although returned by force in the country, Prince Franz Joseph II, Prince of Liechtenstein is understanding and accepts the refugees with the respect due to their rank of combatants. Russian General Boris Smyslovsky tries to monetize the surrender of his troops to U.S. Army rather than to the Red Army. He is working to take them to Argentina, a country where they will not be hunted down, but that is without counting on the hatred of the Soviets for these "traitors".

The film traces the efforts of the Liechtenstein authorities not to hand over these 400 refugees, and shows the lies and manipulations of the Soviets to convince them to return voluntarily. After promising them a new life as part of the reconstruction of the USSR, the Soviets managed to persuade about 200 of these men to return. On the return journey, the train stops in Hungary and all the "returnees" are murdered with machine guns.

Cast
 Malcolm McDowell as General Boris Smyslovsky
 Pierre Vaneck as Dr. Josef Hoop, Prime Minister of Liechtenstein
 Jean-François Balmer as Father Anton Siegler, Speaker of the Parliament of Liechtenstein
 Ludmila Mikaël as Captain Barinkova
 Caroline Sihol as Countess Irène Smyslovsky
 Wojciech Pszoniakas Colonel Tcheko
 Annick Blancheteau as Madame Hoop
 Catherine Frot as Martha Hubner
 Catherine Bidaut as Natalya
 Serge Renko as Petrov Gregori
 Jean de Coninck as Mr. Brandt
 Geneviève Mnich as Mrs. Brandt
 Clémentine Célarié as Anna
 Elena Safonova as Princess of Liechtenstein
 Patrice Alexsandre as Franz Joseph II, Prince of Liechtenstein, 
 Gilles Treton as Peter Hubber

References

External links

1993 films
1990s historical drama films
1990s French films
French-language Swiss films
Films directed by Robert Enrico
Eastern Front of World War II films
Swiss historical drama films
French historical drama films
Films shot in Poland
1990s French-language films
Films set in 1945
Films set in 1946